The 2015–16 Iowa State Cyclones women's basketball team represented Iowa State University in the 2015–16 NCAA Division I women's basketball season. This was head coach Bill Fennelly's 21st season at Iowa State. The Cyclones were members of the Big 12 Conference and played their home games at the Hilton Coliseum. They finished the season 13–17, 5–13 in Big 12 play to finish in eighth place. They lost in the first round of the Big 12 women's tournament to Texas Tech.

Radio
All Cyclones games were carried on the Iowa State Cyclone Radio Network. Not all affiliates carried women's basketball, and some affiliates only carried select games. To learn which stations will carry games, please visit the Cyclone Radio Network affiliate list linked here. Brent Blum and Molly Parrott called all the action for the Cyclone Radio Network and for games on Cyclones.tv.

Roster

Schedule and results

|-
!colspan=9 style="background:#840A2C; color:#FEC938;"| Exhibition

|-
!colspan=9 style="background:#840A2C; color:#FEC938;"| Non-conference regular season

|-
!colspan=9 style="background:#840A2C; color:#FEC938;"| Big 12 Conference Season

|-
!colspan=9 style="background:#840A2C; color:#FEC938;"| Big 12 women's basketball tournament

Rankings
2015–16 NCAA Division I women's basketball rankings

See also
 2015–16 Iowa State Cyclones men's basketball team

References

Iowa State Cyclones women's basketball seasons
Iowa State
Iowa State Cyc
Iowa State Cyc